Dürrenberg (656.4 m above sea level) is a mountain of Bavaria. It is the highest point of the Weißenburg-Gunzenhausen district and of the Hahnenkamm and is situated between Heidenheim and Meinheim 60 km south west of Nuremberg, Germany.

Mountains of Bavaria
Weißenburg-Gunzenhausen